The Model Husband is a 1937 German comedy film directed by Wolfgang Liebeneiner and starring Heinz Rühmann, Leny Marenbach, and Hans Söhnker. It is based on a 1915 American play Fair and Warmer by Avery Hopwood. The film was screened at the Venice Film Festival where it won an award. In the 1950s it was remade twice: a 1956 West German film The Model Husband and a 1959 Swiss The Model Husband.

Synopsis 
A London banker makes a business trip to Venice where he falls in love with a woman who thinks her friend is cheating. They marry, but she soon gets bored because he's the "model husband"—the way she wished previously: he barely looks at other women. In turn no woman shows interest in him. Moral of the story: she said she wished for the model husband but unconsciously desires a Don Juan. Once he understands, he acts like one (a little) and she falls in love again.

The film was censored for youth by the Nazis.

Partial cast

References

Bibliography

External links 
 

1937 films
Films of Nazi Germany
German comedy films
1937 comedy films
1930s German-language films
Films set in London
Films set in Venice
German films based on plays
Films directed by Wolfgang Liebeneiner
German black-and-white films
Tobis Film films
1930s German films